"It Doesn't Matter Anymore" is a pop ballad written by Paul Anka and recorded by Buddy Holly in 1958. The song was issued in January 1959, less than a month before Holly's death.  "It Doesn't Matter Anymore" reached number 13 as a posthumous hit on the Billboard Hot 100 chart in early 1959, shortly after Holly was killed in a plane crash on February 3, 1959. The single was a two-sided hit, backed with "Raining in My Heart". "It Doesn't Matter Anymore" was Holly's last US Top 20 hit and featured the orchestral backing of Dick Jacobs. It was also successful in the United Kingdom, where it became the country's first posthumous number 1 hit.

The song was recorded in mid-October 1958 in New York City. Paul Anka wrote it specifically for Holly. He donated his royalties from the song to Holly's wife. He said: "'It Doesn't Matter Anymore' has a tragic irony about it now, but at least it will help look after Buddy Holly's family. I'm giving my composer's royalty to his widow - it's the least I can do."

The song has been covered many times, most commercially successful by New Zealand-born singer songwriter Mark Williams, who had a number-one hit with it in 1977.

Track listing
"It Doesn't Matter Anymore" (2:01)
"Raining in My Heart" (2:45)

Chart performance
In the United Kingdom the song reached number 1 on April 24, 1959, and remained in that position for three weeks, becoming the first posthumous number 1 hit in UK chart history.  Holly would continue to achieve posthumous chart success in the UK well into the 1960s. In the United States it reached number 13 on the Billboard Hot 100 chart. It was Holly's last Top 20 hit in the United States. Internationally, the song reached number 1 in both Canada and Ireland, and also peaked at number 2 in the Australian charts.

Weekly charts

Year-end charts

Linda Ronstadt version

Linda Ronstadt covered "It Doesn't Matter Anymore" in 1974 on her multi-platinum album Heart Like a Wheel. As the B-side of "When Will I Be Loved," it became a double-sided hit in the United States. The single reached number 20 on the Billboard Adult Contemporary chart, number 47 on the Pop chart, and number 54 on the Country chart in the fall of 1975.

Chart history

Mark Williams' version

"It Doesn't Matter Anymore" was covered by New Zealand-born singer songwriter, Mark Williams. The song was released in April 1977 as the second single from his third studio album, Taking It All In Stride (1977). The song peaked at number 1 on the New Zealand charts and was the highest selling single by a New Zealand artist in New Zealand in 1977.

Track listing
 7" single (EMI – HR 566)
Side A: "It Doesn't Matter Anymore"
Side B: "True Love (Is Never Easy)"

Chart performance

Weekly charts

Year-end charts

Other cover versions

Wanda Jackson included a cover of this song on her 1961 album, There's a Party Goin' On. 
John Barry did an instrumental cover, included on the compilation album The EMI Years: 1961.
Paul Anka himself recorded this song on his 1963 album, 21 Golden Hits, which contains re-recordings of his old hits, most of which he wrote.
Freddie and the Dreamers recorded this song for their album You Were Mad for Me in 1964.
Al Stewart recorded a cover of the song, which was included as a bonus track on a re-release of his 1972 album Orange.
The song was used in the BBC television series Survivors episode 9, sung by Chris Tranchell in 1975.
 Don McLean included a version on his 1978 album Chain Lightning
Hank Marvin performed an instrumental version in 1996 on his album Hank Plays Holly.
The Seekers performed a cover on their 1997 album, Future Road.
Waylon Jennings performed a cover as a bonus track on the 1999 reissue of his album "This Time" with the Crickets in the background
Eva Cassidy's version of the song was the lead-in to her album Imagine, released posthumously in 2002.
Serena Ryder recorded a cover on her 2006 album If Your Memory Serves You Well.
Marty Wilde recorded the song on the DVD release of The 50th Anniversary Concert in 2007.
Australian Gina Jeffreys covered the song on her album, Old Paint (2010).
In season 11 of the television program American Idol, Jessica Sanchez, Deandre Brackensick, and Candice Glover performed the song in the Las Vegas round.
Lucius (with JD McPherson and Jimmy Sutton, recorded live in Brooklyn 2014), included on their 2014 album Wildewoman (Extended Edition)

See also
List of number-one singles from the 1950s (UK)
List of posthumous number-one singles (UK)
List of number-one singles in 1977 (New Zealand)
New Zealand Top 50 singles of 1977

References
General
Whitburn, Joel (2000). Top Pop Singles 1955-1999. Record Research Inc. .

Specific

1959 singles
Buddy Holly songs
Linda Ronstadt songs
UK Singles Chart number-one singles
Songs written by Paul Anka
Songs released posthumously
Paul Anka songs
1958 songs
Coral Records singles
EMI Records singles
1977 singles
Mark Williams (singer) songs
Number-one singles in New Zealand
Pop ballads
1950s ballads